Hendrick van der Burgh (1627 – after 1664), was a Dutch Golden Age genre painter.

Biography
According to the Netherlands Institute for Art History (RKD) he was born in Delft and was a member of the same "school" or artistic style as Pieter de Hooch, showing simple intimate scenes of daily life in towns. Though no evidence for such a school exists, the artists whose works fall into this category are considered by the RKD to be Esaias Boursse, Hendrick van der Burgh, Pieter de Hooch, Pieter Janssens Elinga, Cornelis de Man, Hendrick ten Oever, and Jacob Vrel. The year and place of his death is uncertain but is assumed to be Delft or Leiden after 1664. He is registered in Leiden in 1658-1659 and in Delft in 1664. He is known for prints and portraits, with the monogram "HVB".

References

Hendrick van der Burgh on Artnet

External links
Vermeer and The Delft School, a full text exhibition catalog from The Metropolitan Museum of Art, which contains material on Hendrick van der Burgh

1627 births
1664 deaths
Dutch Golden Age painters
Dutch male painters
Painters from Leiden
Artists from Delft
Painters from Delft
Dutch genre painters